Mordellistena perparvula is a species of beetle in the genus Mordellistena of the family Mordellidae. It was described by Ermisch in 1966 and is endemic to Hungary.

References

Beetles described in 1966
perparvula
Beetles of Europe
Endemic fauna of Hungary